Union City Commercial Historic District is a national historic district located at Union City, Randolph County, Indiana.  The district encompasses 53 contributing buildings in the central business district of Union City.  The district developed between about 1870 and 1948 and includes notable examples of Italianate and Romanesque Revival, style architecture.  Located in the district is the separately listed Raphael Kirshbaum Building.  Other notable buildings include the Jackson Building (1892), J.K. Building (1889), Grazhs Building (1893), and Union City Post Office (1935).

It was added to the National Register of Historic Places in 1999.

References

Historic districts on the National Register of Historic Places in Indiana
Romanesque Revival architecture in Indiana
Italianate architecture in Indiana
Historic districts in Randolph County, Indiana
National Register of Historic Places in Randolph County, Indiana